Lissy is a 1957 East German film directed by Konrad Wolf, based on a novel by Franz Carl Weiskopf. It was released on 30 May 1957.

Plot
Lissy Schroeder, a working-class girl in Berlin, marries Alfred, a clerk.  In 1932, Alfred is fired by his Jewish boss.  Despite having ties to the Communist party through Lissy's brother Paul, the previously apolitical Alfred joins the Nazi party.  After Hitler gains power, Paul is shot by the Nazis, causing Lissy to question the country's and her husband's politics and where her loyalties truly lie.

Cast
 Sonja Sutter as Lissy Schröder / Frohmeyer
 Horst Drinda as Alfred Frohmeyer
 Hans-Peter Minetti as Paul Schröder
 Kurt Oligmüller as Kaczmierczik
 Gerhard Bienert as Vater Schröder
 Else Wolz as Mutter Schröder
 Raimund Schelcher as Max Franke
 Christa Gottschalk as Toni Franke

References

External links
 

1957 films
East German films
1950s German-language films
Films set in Berlin
Films directed by Konrad Wolf
1950s German films